Louiqa Raschid (born March 17, 1958 in Sri Lanka) is a computer scientist in the USA who specializes in data base management and data science with applications in biology, medicine, financial and socio-economic data and disaster management. She is a professor in the Robert H. Smith School of Business and UMIACS at the University of Maryland, College Park.

Education and career
Raschid attended Bishop's College and St. Bridget's Convent in Sri Lanka, and won first place among all Sri Lankans in the 1973 General Certificate of Education, before moving to India for her university education. She earned a bachelor's degree in 1980 from the Indian Institute of Technology Madras, and completed her Ph.D. in electrical engineering in 1987 at the University of Florida.

She joined the Robert H. Smith School of Business as an assistant professor in 1987, and was promoted to full professor there in 2002. She has also been affiliated with the computer science department at the University of Maryland since 1994.

She served as editor-in-chief of the ACM Journal of Data and Information Quality from 2013 to 2017.

Recognition
Raschid was named a Fellow of the Association for Computing Machinery in 2016 "for data management and integration in non-traditional domains including biomedicine, finance, and humanitarian applications".
She was recognized as a Fellow of the IEEE in 2021.

References

External links
Home page

Living people
American computer scientists
Sri Lankan computer scientists
Sri Lankan women scientists
Sri Lankan women computer scientists
IIT Madras alumni
University of Florida alumni
University of Maryland, College Park faculty
Fellows of the Association for Computing Machinery
1958 births